The 1978 Boise State Broncos football team represented Boise State University in the 1978 NCAA Division I-AA football season. The Broncos competed in the Big Sky Conference and played their home games on campus at Bronco Stadium in Boise, Idaho.

This was the first season for the newly created Division I-AA, which the Big Sky joined. It was previously a Division II conference for football, except for Division I member Idaho, which moved down to I-AA this season.

Following this season, Boise State was put on probation for a scouting violation in November prior to the NAU game; the Broncos were ineligible for the league title or I-AA playoffs in 1979.

Schedule

Rankings

Roster

NFL Draft
Two Broncos were selected in the 1979 NFL Draft, which lasted twelve rounds (330 selections).

References

External links
Bronco Football Stats – 1978

Boise State
Boise State Broncos football seasons
Boise State Broncos football